Searle Turton (born 23 June 1979) is a Canadian politician who was elected in the 2019 Alberta general election to the Legislative Assembly of Alberta representing the electoral district of Spruce Grove-Stony Plain. Turton previously served as a City Councillor in the City of Spruce Grove from 2010- 2019 until his election as MLA for Spruce Grove-Stony Plain.

Electoral history

2019 general election

References

1979 births
United Conservative Party MLAs
Living people
People from Spruce Grove
Politicians from Regina, Saskatchewan
21st-century Canadian politicians
Alberta municipal councillors